Saudefaldene is a hydroelectric power company in Sauda, Norway.

It was founded in 1913 to harness hydropower in the Sauda Watershed. It was bought by Union Carbide in 1925. After the national escheat came into effect in 1979 both Saudefaldene and the production company Sauda Smelteverk were bought by Norwegian company Elkem.

References

Energy companies established in 1913
1913 establishments in Norway
Electric power companies of Norway
Companies based in Rogaland
Energy companies disestablished in 1979
1979 disestablishments in Norway
Defunct energy companies of Norway